Godfrey Chitalu (1947–1993) was a Zambian former professional footballer who represented the Zambia national football team in international level from 1968 to 1980. During that time, he amassed 108 caps and scored 79 international goals making him the all-time record goalscorer for the Zambia national team, highest international goalscorer from an African nation and eighth-highest international goalscorer in history.

International goals

Statistics

References

Chitalu
Chitalu